Boso may refer to:

People
Boso of Provence (850–887), Frankish nobleman and king
Boso the Elder (c. 800–855), a Frank from the Bosonid dynasty
Boso, Margrave of Tuscany (885–936), Italian nobleman
Boso II of Arles (d. 967), Frankish count
Boso of Merseburg (d. 970), German bishop
Boso of Sant'Anastasia (d. c. 1127), cardinal and bishop of Turin
Boso of Santa Pudenziana (d. c. 1178), Italian cardinal
Greg Boso (b. 1957), West Virginia State Senator
Cap Boso (b. 1963), American football player

Places
Bōsō Peninsula, in Japan
Boso (Gojjam), a marketplace in Bure, Ethiopia
Boso, Ghana, a village

See also
Bōsō Hill Range
Bozo (disambiguation)